The 1937 St. Thomas (Pennsylvania) Tommies football team was an American football team that represented St. Thomas College (later renamed the University of Scranton) during the 1937 college football season. The team compiled a 6–1–1 record and outscored opponents by a total of 109 to 33. The team played its home games at Athletic Park in Scranton, Pennsylvania.

Tom Davies, former back with the Pittsburgh Panthers, was hired in May 1937 as the school's head football coach. Robert "Pop" Jones was an assistant coach.

Schedule

References

Scranton
Scranton Royals football seasons
St. Thomas (PA) football